"Centrolene" robledoi is a species of frog in the family Centrolenidae. It is endemic to Colombia.
Its natural habitats are subtropical or tropical moist lowland forests, subtropical or tropical moist montane forests, and rivers. It is threatened by habitat loss.

References

robledoi
Frogs of South America
Amphibians of Colombia
Endemic fauna of Colombia
Taxonomy articles created by Polbot